Omran Haydary (born 13 January 1998) is an Afghan professional footballer who plays for I liga side Arka Gdynia, on loan from Lechia Gdańsk, and the Afghanistan national team. Besides Poland, he has played in the Netherlands.

Club career

FC Emmen
In July 2017, Haydary moved to FC Emmen on a free transfer following the end of his youth contract with Roda JC.
He made his Eerste Divisie debut for FC Emmen on 15 September 2017 in a game against N.E.C. He scored his first league goal for the club on 29 September 2017 in a 2–2 away draw with De Graafschap. His goal, assisted by Keziah Veendorp, came in the 67th minute. On 19 April 2018, Haydary's contract with Emmen was terminated by mutual consent.

Dordrecht
Haydary spent just five days as a free agent before being offered a contract by Dordrecht. He made his league debut for the club on 24 August 2018 in a 5–2 away defeat to Ajax II. He scored his first league goal for the club on 21 September 2018 in a 2–1 away defeat to MVV Maastricht. His goal, assisted by Maarten Peijnenburg, came in the 91st minute.

On 31 January 2019, Haydary terminated his contract by mutual consent.

Poland
At the start of the 2019–20 season, he joined Polish club Olimpia Grudziądz. In January 2020, he was recruited by Lechia Gdańsk for a fee reported to be around €125,000. He made his debut for Lechia Gdańsk on March 1, 2020 against Korona Kielce in which he started as right winger.

On 6 July 2022, he was loaned to I liga side Arka Gdynia, Lechia's arch-rivals, for a year.

International career
Haydary debuted for the Afghanistan national football team in a 0–0 friendly tie with Palestine on 19 August 2018.

International goals
Scores and results list Afghanistan's goal tally first.

References

External links
 
 

1998 births
Living people
Sportspeople from Heerlen
Afghan footballers
Afghan expatriate footballers
Afghanistan international footballers
Dutch footballers
Afghan emigrants to the Netherlands
Dutch expatriate footballers
Afghan expatriate sportspeople in Poland
FC Emmen players
FC Dordrecht players
Olimpia Grudziądz players
Lechia Gdańsk players
Lechia Gdańsk II players
Arka Gdynia players
Eerste Divisie players
I liga players
IV liga players
Ekstraklasa players
Association football forwards
Expatriate footballers in Poland
People from Mazar-i-Sharif
Footballers from Limburg (Netherlands)